Are You Happy? is the fifteenth studio album of the Japanese idol group Arashi. The album was released on October 26, 2016 under their record label J Storm in two editions: a first press/limited edition and a regular edition. The regular edition comes with a 36-page lyrics booklet and the limited edition comes with an 80-page photo lyrics and a bonus DVD with the music video and making-of for "Don't You Get It?". The album sold over 636,000 copies in its first week and topped the Oricon charts. With more than 720,000 copies sold, the album was certified for Triple Platinum by the Recording Industry Association of Japan (RIAJ). It was released digitally on February 7, 2020.

Album information
The limited edition contains a CD with sixteen tracks and the regular edition contains a CD with seventeen tracks. The limited edition comes with an 80-page photo lyrics booklet and a bonus DVD with the music video and making of for "Don't You Get It?", while the regular edition comes with a 36-page lyrics booklet and a bonus track. The album jacket cover for both editions are different.

Songs
"Are You Happy?" includes three of the group's previously released singles: "Ai o Sakebe", "Fukkatsu Love", and "I Seek/Daylight". This album also includes nine new songs plus five of each member's solo songs. In addition to their solo songs, each of the members were in charge of an original Arashi song using the "Happy" theme.

"Ai o Sakebe" was used as the background song for the Recruit Zexy commercial and "Fukkatsu Love" was used as the background song for the NTT DoCoMo d hits commercial. "I seek" was used as the theme song for the drama Sekai Ichi Muzukashii Koi starring Arashi member Satoshi Ohno, and "Daylight" was used as the theme song for the drama 99.9 Keiji Senmon Bengoshi starring Arashi member Jun Matsumoto. "Don't You Get It?" was used as the background song for Hitachi's robot cleaner commercial, "Minimaru".

Promotion
To support their new album, Arashi performed a live tour, ARASHI LIVE TOUR 2016-2017 Are You Happy?, performing at all the major dome stadiums in Japan. They had 18 performances beginning on November 11 at the Sapporo Dome, followed by Tokyo Dome on November 19, Kyocera Osaka Dome on December 2, Nagoya Dome on December 16, Tokyo Dome on December 26, 2016, and Fukuoka Dome on January 6, 2017.

On November 9, the band announced an Album x 5-Dome Tour Collaboration Project, the "ARASHI Are You Happy? campaign", to commemorate the release of the album and the start of their dome tour. A smartphone only promotion site opened on November 11, 9:00 (JST) where eighteen original "Are You Happy?" wallpapers were made available to download for customers who purchased the regular edition of their album. A user code can be found on the cover strip of the regular edition. To access the wallpapers, customers entered the user code into the promotion site where they could pick up to three wallpapers to download.

Track listing

Chart performance
"Are You Happy?" debuted at number one on the Oricon daily album chart selling 315,741 copies upon its release and selling 636,619 copies by the end of the week, topping the Oricon weekly album chart. The album sold 56,214 copies in its second week and ranked second on the weekly album chart. The album stayed in the top ten for four consecutive weeks. With more than 720,000 copies sold, "Are You Happy?" was certified for Triple Platinum by RIAJ.

Charts and certifications

Weekly charts

Year-end charts

Sales and certifications

Awards
The album was listed as one of the Best 5 Albums for the 31st Japan Gold Disc Awards.

Release history

Footnotes

References

External links
Are You Happy product information
Hard Copy Sales Certifications (RIAJ)

2016 albums
Arashi albums
Japanese-language albums
J Storm albums